Bikhra Mera Naseeb is a 2014 Pakistani drama serial directed by Furqan Khan, produced by A&B Entertainment and written by Saima Younus. The drama stars Ayeza Khan, Sami Khan, Alizey Rasool and Feroze Khan in lead roles. The drama was first aired 2 May 2014 on Geo Entertainment.

Synopsis 
The story revolves around Hina (Ayeza Khan) whose life is full of fun and parties. She is the daughter of Basit Alvi, who tries to protect her from the wrong people. Still, she falls prey to wrong company, which leads her to the wrong path. The person spoiling Hina is Sania Begum. The other protagonist in the story is Ujala (Aleezay Rasool), who struggles to survive daily. Her father is very ill and the financial condition is bad due to which, she has to go and live with her relatives. Basit Alvi then comes into Ujala's life and takes care of her education and her father's treatment. However, Hina feels neglected and is jealous of Ujala and her family. The feeling is mutual as Hina always humiliates Ujala.

Cast 
 Ayeza Khan as Hina Alvi
 Sami Khan as Haris
 Alizey Rasool as Ujala
 Feroze Khan
 Shehryar Zaidi
 Saba Hameed
 Ismat Zaidi
 Mehmood Akhtar
 Seemi Pasha
 Fozia Mushtaq

References

External links 
 

2014 Pakistani television series debuts
A&B Entertainment
Geo TV original programming
Pakistani drama television series
Urdu-language television shows